Buttigliera may refer to:

 Buttigliera Alta, populated place in Piedmont, Italy
 Buttigliera d'Asti, populated place in Piedmont, Italy

See also 
Bottiglieri